Chum bucket or chumbucket can mean:

 a bucket used to hold "chum" in the practice of chumming
the Chum Bucket, the fictional restaurant run by Plankton and Karen in SpongeBob SquarePants
 a chumbox, a form of online advertising